Jason D. Small (born July 1, 1978) is an American politician serving as a member of the Montana Senate from the 21st district, which includes Busby, Montana. He is a member of the Northern Cheyenne Nation.

Small earned an Associate of Applied Science degree in welding and metallurgy from Sheridan College. Outside of politics, he has worked as a boilermaker.

References

Living people
People from Big Horn County, Montana
Republican Party Montana state senators
Native American state legislators in Montana
Northern Cheyenne people
21st-century American politicians
1978 births